Basic Element Ltd. (or simply ) is one of the largest diversified industrial groups in Russia. The company was founded in 1997 and is owned by Oleg Deripaska. It is based in the British tax haven of Jersey and is headquartered in Moscow. It was known as Siberian Aluminum until 2001.

Overview 
Basic Element manages Oleg Deripaska's investments into the six economic sectors of energy and mining, manufacturing, financial services, construction and real estate, agribusiness, and airport and airline management.

Over 150,000 people work at the group's companies in Russia and the CIS, Africa, Australia, Asia, Europe, and Latin America as of 2014.

In 2007 the company's revenues were US$26.8 billion, representing 45% growth relative to the previous year, and it had US$45 billion worth of assets. In 2012 the company's revenues were US$27 billion.

Basic Element built several Olympic facilities for 2014 Winter Olympics in Sochi, including the Coastal Olympic Village, Imeretisnkiy sea port, Doubler of Kurortny Avenue in Sochi, renovation of the Sochi International Airport. The total investments account for over $1.4 billion.

In June 2016, after the United States Treasury listed Basel on its list of Russian Oligarchs, Officials, and Entities in Response to Worldwide Malign Activity, Valery Pechenkin became the general director of Basel, replacing Gulzhan Moldazhanova. Moldazhanova had been the general director from 2005 until 2009, when Deripaska became general director, and then again from the summer of 2012 until June 2018.

Operations

Energy and mining sector 
En+ Group is Russia-based diversified mining, metals, and energy group. En+ Group holds:
 a 47.41% stake in alumina and aluminium producer UC RUSAL
 a 100% stake in EuroSibEnergo PLC power company
 a 100% in Strikeforce Mining and Resources Ltd (SMR) (ferromolybdenum producer)
 a 100% in En+ Downstream (includes aluminium downstream assets)
 a 100% in En+ Coal
 Central European Aluminium Company (CEAC), which has run the Kombinat Aluminijuma Podgorica (KAP) aluminium smelter in Montenegro, and the Rudnic Boxita Niksic bauxite mine, which supplies raw materials for the smelter, since 2005.
 Dmitrov Pilot Plant for Aluminium Canning Tape (DOZAKL) strip with a polished surface for the manufacture of lamplight reflectors and lath ceilings.

Machine building sector 
JSC Russian Machines was established in 2005 to unite Basic Element's machine building assets.

Airport management 
Basel Aero, a joint venture between the Singaporean Changi Airports International, Basic Element, Sochi International Airport and the Russian Sberbank, is a company-operator of airports in Sochi, Krasnodar, and Anapa. As of 2015 the company handles 9.5% of total passenger traffic and 3.5% of the total cargo traffic in Russia.

Basel Aero Airports
 Sochi Airport
 Krasnodar Airport
 Anapa Airport

Financial services sector 
Basic Element has been managing Oleg Deripaska's personal stake in the amount of 10% of Ingosstrakh's ordinary shares.

Construction sector 
JSC Glavstroy is a vertically integrated construction holding corporation. Management functions are carried out by Glavstroy-Management.

Other businesses

Agribusiness
 Kuban AgroHolding
 AquaDin (LLC), manufacturer of non-alcoholic beverages
 Voskhod Stud Farm

Port business
 Imeretinsky Port, Sochi

Real estate
 BasEl Real Estate

Notes

References

External links 
Basic Element company website

 
Conglomerate companies of Russia
Investment companies of Russia
Multinational companies headquartered in Russia
Russian brands
Conglomerate companies established in 1997
Russian companies established in 1997
Companies based in Moscow
Russian entities subject to the U.S. Department of the Treasury sanctions